Gholaman Rural District is a rural district (dehestan) in Raz and Jargalan District, Bojnord County, North Khorasan Province, Iran. At the 2006 census, its population was 13,965, in 3,297 families.  The rural district has 16 villages.

References 

Rural Districts of North Khorasan Province
Bojnord County